The Comunità montana di Valle Camonica is an administrative union of 41 comuni of the Valle Camonica, in the province of Brescia in north-east Lombardy, Italy. It is responsible for the administration of the Parco dell'Adamello nature reserve, which includes the Adamello mountain.

References

Subdivisions of Italy